The Medal "For Strengthening Military Cooperation" was a military award of the Soviet Union established on May 25, 1979, by Decree of the Presidium of the Supreme Soviet.  Its statute was later confirmed and slightly amended by Decree of the Presidium of the Supreme Soviet No. 2523-X of July 18, 1980.  It was bestowed to recognise outstanding cooperation between the different services and the different armed forces of the various Warsaw Pact countries or of any other friendly socialist state.

Award statute 
The Medal "For Strengthening Military Cooperation" was awarded to military personnel as well as to employees of organs of state security or of the Ministry of Internal Affairs, and to other citizens of the states participants of the Warsaw Pact, as well as other socialist and other friendly nations for merit in strengthening military cooperation.

The conferring authority was the Presidium of the Supreme Soviet of the USSR based on recommendations from the Minister of Defence or the USSR, the Minister of Internal Affairs of the USSR, or from the Chairman of the State Security Committee of the USSR.  The medal could be earned multiple times.

The Medal "For Strengthening Military Cooperation" is  worn on the left side of the chest and in the presence of other medals of the Soviet Union is located after the medal "Veteran of the Armed Forces of the USSR".  When worn in company of awards of the Russian Federation, the latter have precedence.

Award description 
The Medal "For Strengthening Military Cooperation" was a 32mm in diameter gilt tombac circular medal. On the obverse, a red enamelled five pointed star with a shield at its center. Two relief laurel branches follow the left and right circumference of the medal passing under the points of the star. At the bottom of the obverse, crossed swords, their hilts below the star, their blades passing under the lower arms of the star and protruding over the laurels to the medal rim. The reverse of the medal is plain.

The medal is secured to a standard Russian pentagonal mount by a ring through the medal suspension loop. The mount is covered by a 24 mm wide silk moiré ribbon in the colours of the flags of the Warsaw Pact countries.  The ribbon's coloured stripes alternate from left to right in the following widths: green 4 mm, white 1 mm, red 5.5 mm, yellow 1 mm, black 1 mm, yellow 1 mm, red 5.5 mm, white 1 mm and blue 4 mm.

Recipients (partial list) 
The individuals below were all recipients of the Medal "For Strengthening Military Cooperation".

 Polish General and President Wojciech Witold Jaruzelski
 Chuvash cosmonaut Andriyan Grigoryevich Nikolayev
 Major General cosmonaut Pavel Romanovich Popovich
 Marshal of the Soviet Union and Defence Minister Dmitriy Feodorovich Ustinov
 Marshal of Aviation Alexander Ivanovich Pokryshkin
 Cosmonaut Lieutenant General Vladimir Vladimirovich Vasyutin
 Former Mayor of Moscow Yury Mikhaylovich Luzhkov
 Major General cosmonaut Yury Nikolayevich Glazkov
 Marshal of the Soviet Union Sergey Fyodorovich Akhromeyev
 Army General Anatoly Vasiliyevich Kvashnin
 Marshal of the Soviet Union Pavel Fyodorovich Batitsky
 Marshal of the Soviet Union Semyon Konstantinovich Kurkotkin
 Marshal of the Soviet Union Vasily Ivanovich Petrov
 Army General Semion Pavlovich Ivanov
 Army General Sagadat Nurmagambetov
 General Secretary of the Central Committee of the Communist Party of the Soviet Union Leonid Ilyich Brezhnev
 General Secretary of the Central Committee of the Communist Party of the Soviet Union Mikhail Sergeyevich Gorbachev
 Cosmonaut Major General Vladimir Aleksandrovich Shatalov
 Cosmonaut Colonel Yevgeni Vassilyevich Khrunov
 Major General Wolfgang Thonke
 Scientist, statesman and liberal politician Boris Nemtsov
 Chief of Czechoslovakia Civil Defence Colonel Ing. Josef Voldřich
Vietnamese Chief of General Staff Hoàng Văn Thái
Günter Voigt

See also 
Orders, decorations, and medals of the Soviet Union
Badges and Decorations of the Soviet Union
Warsaw Pact

References

External links 
 Legal Library of the USSR

Military awards and decorations of the Soviet Union
1979 establishments in the Soviet Union
Awards established in 1979
Warsaw Pact